Elizabeth de Bohun (née de Badlesmere), Countess of Northampton (1313 – 8 June 1356) was the wife of two English noblemen, Sir Edmund Mortimer and William de Bohun, 1st Earl of Northampton. She was a co-heiress of her brother Giles de Badlesmere, 2nd Baron Badlesmere.

At the age of eight she was sent to the Tower of London along with her mother, Margaret de Clare, Baroness Badlesmere and her four siblings after the former maltreated Queen consort Isabella by ordering an assault upon her and refusing her admittance to Leeds Castle.

Family
Elizabeth was born at Castle Badlesmere, Kent, England in 1313 to Bartholomew de Badlesmere, 1st Baron Badlesmere and Margaret de Clare. She was the third of four daughters. She had one younger brother, Giles de Badlesmere, 2nd Baron Badlesmere, who married Elizabeth Montagu, but did not have any children.

Her paternal grandparents were Guncelin de Badlesmere and Joan FitzBernard, and her maternal grandparents were Thomas de Clare, Lord of Thomond and Juliana FitzGerald of Offaly.

Elizabeth's father was hanged, drawn and quartered on 14 April 1322 for having participated in the Earl of Lancaster's rebellion against King Edward II of England; and her mother imprisoned in the Tower of London until 3 November 1322. She had been arrested the previous October for ordering an assault upon Queen consort Isabella after refusing her admittance to Leeds Castle, where Baron Badlesmere held the post of governor. Elizabeth and her siblings were also sent to the Tower along with their mother. She was eight years old at the time and had been married for five years to her first husband; although the marriage had not yet been consummated due to her young age.

In 1328, Elizabeth's brother Giles obtained a reversal of his father's attainder, and he succeeded to the barony as the 2nd Baron Badlesmere. Elizabeth, along with her three sisters, was a co-heiress of Giles, who had no children by his wife. Upon his death in 1338, the barony fell into abeyance. The Badlesmere estates were divided among the four sisters, and Elizabeth's share included the manors of Drayton in Sussex, Kingston and Erith in Kent, a portion of Finmere in Oxfordshire as well as property in London.

Marriages and issue
On 27 June 1316, when she was just three years old, Elizabeth was married to her first husband Sir Edmund Mortimer (died 16 December 1331) eldest son and heir of Roger Mortimer, 1st Earl of March and Joan de Geneville. The marriage contract was made on 9 May 1316, and the particulars of the arrangement between her father and prospective father-in-law are described in Welsh historian R. R. Davies' Lords and Lordship in the British Isles in the late Middle Ages. Lord Badlesmere paid Roger Mortimer the sum of £2000, and in return Mortimer endowed Elizabeth with five rich manors for life and the reversion of other lands. The marriage, which was not consummated until many years afterward, produced two sons:

 Roger Mortimer, 2nd Earl of March (11 November 1328 Ludlow Castle- 26 February 1360), married Philippa Montagu, daughter of William Montagu, 1st Earl of Salisbury and Catherine Grandison, by whom he had issue, including Edmund Mortimer, 3rd Earl of March).
 John Mortimer (died young)

By the order of King Edward III, Elizabeth's father-in-law, the Earl of Mortimer was hanged in November 1330 for having assumed royal power, along with other crimes. His estates were forfeited to the Crown, therefore Elizabeth's husband did not succeed to the earldom and died a year later. Elizabeth's dower included the estates of Maelienydd and Comot Deuddwr in the Welsh Marches.  

In 1335, just over three years after the death of Edmund Mortimer, Elizabeth married secondly William de Bohun, 1st Earl of Northampton (1312–1360), fifth son of Humphrey de Bohun, 4th Earl of Hereford and Elizabeth of Rhuddlan. He was a renowned military commander and diplomat. Their marriage was arranged to end the mutual hostility which had existed between the Bohun and Mortimer families. A papal dispensation was required for their marriage as de Bohun and her first husband, Sir Edmund Mortimer were related in the third and fourth degrees of consanguinity by dint of their common descent from Enguerrand de Fiennes, Seigneur de Fiennes. Elizabeth and de Bohun received some Mortimer estates upon their marriage. 

By her second marriage, Elizabeth had two more children:

 Humphrey de Bohun, 7th Earl of Hereford 6th Earl of Essex, 2nd Earl of Northampton (24 March 1342 – 16 January 1373), after 9 September 1359, married Joan Fitzalan, Countess of Hereford, by whom he had two daughters, Eleanor de Bohun, Duchess of Gloucester, and Mary de Bohun, wife of Henry of Bolingbroke (who later reigned as King Henry IV).
 Elizabeth de Bohun (c.1350- 3 April 1385), on 28 September 1359, married Richard Fitzalan, 11th Earl of Arundel, by whom she had seven children including Thomas Fitzalan, 12th Earl of Arundel, Elizabeth FitzAlan, and Joan FitzAlan, Baroness Bergavenny.

In 1348, the earldom of March was restored to her eldest son Roger who succeeded as the 2nd Earl.

Death
Elizabeth de Badlesmere died on 8 June 1356, aged about forty-three years old. She was buried in Black Friars Priory, London. She left a will dated 31 May 1356, requesting burial at the priory. Mention of Elizabeth's burial is found in the records (written in Latin) of Walden Abbey which confirm that she was buried in Black Friars:

Anno Domini MCCCIxx.obiit Willielmus de Boun, Comes Northamptoniae, cujus corpus sepelitur in paret boreali presbyterii nostri. Et Elizabetha uxor ejus sepelitur Lundoniae in ecclesia fratrum praedictorum ante major altare.

Ancestry

References

Further reading
Thomas B. Costain, The Three Edwards, Published by Doubleday, 1958
Charles Cawley,Medieval Lands, Earls of March 1328–1425 (Mortimer)

1313 births
1356 deaths
Daughters of barons
English countesses
14th-century English people
14th-century English women
Prisoners in the Tower of London
Elizabeth
People from Badlesmere, Kent
Wives of knights